The 2013–14 Algerian Women's Championship was the 16th season of the Algerian Women's Championship, the Algerian national women's association football competition. Afak Relizane won the championship for the fifth time consecutively.

Results

References

Algerian Women's Championship seasons